Michael Felke (Laufersweiler, 18 April 1895 - Sohren, 8 April 1977) was a German furniture manufacturer.

Life 
Michael Felke was the first of four children and came from a poor family background. He learned the job of a joiner in his father’s small carpenter's workshop in Laufersweiler (State of Rhineland-Palatinate).
Michael Felke inherited his father’s carpenter's workshop in 1919 after World War I. He then moved the workshop to Sohren in 1928 and started expanding - the beginning of the company Felke-Möbelwerke GmbH & Co.KG.

Due to his dedication he was known as an industrial pioneer in the Hunsrück region. He managed to boost the region’s industry and created many jobs.

Michael Felke was married to Maria Felke and the father of 3 sons.
Among his sons were Aloys Felke, manufacturer and politician, and Günter Felke, manufacturer, numismatist and patron.

Distinctions 
In 1957 Pope Pius XII decorated Michael Felke with the „Pro Ecclesia et Pontifice“ award for his social commitment. His home town Sohren nominated Felke honorary citizen. In 1965 he was awarded the German Federal Cross of Merit, First class.

References 

1895 births
1977 deaths
People from Rhein-Hunsrück-Kreis
German Roman Catholics
German furniture makers
Officers Crosses of the Order of Merit of the Federal Republic of Germany
People from the Rhine Province